Live Fast, Die Fast: Wicked Tales of Booze, Birds and Bad Language is the debut album by English heavy metal band, Wolfsbane. The album was released on 14 August 1989 and produced by Rick Rubin for his Def American label. Promotional videos were made for two songs from this album, "Man Hunt" and "I Like It Hot", both of which received significant airplay on MTV's Headbangers Ball.

Track listing 
 "Man Hunt" - 2:54
 "Shakin'" - 3:41
 "Killing Machine" - 2:55
 "Fell Out of Heaven" - 3:03
 "Money to Burn" - 3:49
 "Greasy" - 3:16
 "I Like It Hot" - 3:19
 "All or Nothing" - 2:02
 "Tears from a Fool" - 5:11
 "Pretty Baby" - 4:44

Personnel
Blaze Bayley: Vocals
Jason Edwards: Guitar
Jeff Hately: Bass
Steve Ellet: Drums

References

1989 debut albums
Wolfsbane (band) albums
Albums produced by Rick Rubin
American Recordings (record label) albums